Lactovum is a genus of bacteria within the family Streptococcaceae. The genus contains a single species, Lactovum miscens, an aerotolerant, anaerobic species originally isolated from soil from the Stiegerwald forest in Germany.

The genome sequence of the DF1 strain of Lactovum has been sequenced.  It has a genome size of 2.1 million bases.  It contains a CRISPR cluster which provides immunity against infectious phages. It also contains a fibronectin/fibrinogen-binding protein, a lysozyme and a regulator of exopolysaccharide synthesis for biofilm formation.

References 

 
Monotypic bacteria genera